Marubhoomiyile Aana is an Indian Malayalam-language comedy film directed by V. K. Prakash. It stars Biju Menon in the role of a Qatar-born Malayali Sheikh in the Middle East. Filming locations include Qatar and Kerala. The film was released on 12 August 2016.

Plot
Sughu and his family were rich and Kamalan was their steward. Sughu's father was an alcoholic, so Kamalan used that and turned over his employer's land and house in his name. Kamalan now lives a life of luxury and his cunning knack helps him to amass more wealth. Sughu is in love with Kamal's daughter Keerthi. He plans to make quick money through trafficking drugs to Qatar, a one time deal that could help him regain his family's honor and get his girl. However, matters doesn't go well, and he gets very less money compared to the amount promised.

When going back to Kerala, he gets tied up with a penniless Half-Malayali Sheikh named Sultan Hamad Bin Saud Bin Khalifa Bin Jasim Al Thani Mohammed in the airport. There is a murder case that has followed with the Sheikh from Qatar. The identity of the Sheikh, Sughu's own story of love, Kamal's greedy plans, and the murder case that has followed them to Kerala are all thick plot-lines which are explored.

Cast
 Biju Menon as His Highness Sheikh Sultan Hamad Bin Saud Bin Khalifa Bin Jasim Al Thani Mohammed
 Krishna Shankar as Sukumara Menon (Suku)
 Lalu Alex as Kamalaasanan
 Balu Varghese as Martin
 Samskruthy Shenoy as Keerthy
 Hareesh Perumanna as Satheesan, Sughu's brother-in-law
 Saju Navodaya as Satheeshan, Kamal's PA
 Major Ravi as Mahesh, Qatar Vigilance officer
 Sunil Sukhada as Francis Pannadan, Bride's Rich & Affluent father
 Bindu Panicker as Pannadan's wife
 Rosin Jolly as Sukanya, Keerthy's friend
 Shafna as Bride, Pannadan's daughter 
Jennifer Antony as Deepa, Keerthy's mother
 Jayaraj Warrier as Porinju, Jewellery owner
 Arun Ghosh as Joy Cheruvarakkal, Qatar businessman
 Mamukkoya as Gafoor (Cameo appearance)
 Indira Thampi as old lady at airport
 Sneha Sreekumar

Production 
Principal photography began in late April 2016, soon after which Samskruthy Shenoy was cast as the film's lead actress. Krishna Shankar, plays the major role in the film, which was first offered to Asif Ali. The shooting ended on 20 June 2016.

Animal rights issue 
During a shooting session of the film in March 2016, a tiger, who allegedly escaped from the sets, was seen roaming through a Doha express highway. A video of the tiger's escape quickly went viral online, causing the makers of the film to face heavy backlash from social media, international news agencies, and animal rights activists. The situation cooled off only after the makers called a press release and clarified that "the big cat had escaped from its cage when it was being taken to the shooting site." The producers of the film were eventually fined for not handling the animal properly. "The video featuring a tiger appeared at Doha Express highway has gone viral on the internet and the truth is that the tiger was brought there for the shoot of film Marubhoomiyile Aana and had to pay a big penalty for the incident (sic)," the makers had posted on the Facebook page of the movie.

Release 
The film was released in India on 12 August 2016.

References

External links
 

2016 films
2016 comedy films
2010s Malayalam-language films
Indian comedy films
Films directed by V. K. Prakash
Films shot in Thrissur
Films shot in Qatar